John Maringouin is an American film director.
His debut feature, Running Stumbled, received wide critical acclaim and was referred to by Variety as a "phantasmagoric filmmaking debut" Maringouin received a Spirit award nomination for the film.

Maringouin's second feature, Big River Man,  is about endurance swimmer Martin Strel's 2007 attempt to swim the entire Amazon river.   The film won multiple 2009 documentary awards including the Cinematography Award at the 2009 Sundance Film Festival.  The film received almost unanimous critical praise and was described by The Times as "an absolute epic" It is distributed by Planet Green.

In 2016, Maringouin won the Special Jury Award for Best Editing in Sundance's World Cinema Documentary Competition for his work on We Are X.

Maringouin's 2018 film Ghostbox Cowboy premiered in the narrative competition at the 2018 Tribeca Film Festival. Arnav Srivastav of High on Films wrote "The premise of Ghostbox Cowboy involves an interesting phase in the creation of counter-cultures and trans-national relations in the 21st century".

Filmography 
 Just Another Day in the Homeland (2004)
 Running Stumbled (2006)
 Big River Man (2009)
 We Are X (2016) - cinematography and editing
 Ghostbox Cowboy (2018)

References

External links 
 
 Big River Man official site
 Running Stumbled official site
 https://www.variety.com/review/VE1117930784.html?categoryid=31&cs=1
 https://web.archive.org/web/20091009100145/http://www.amctv.com/spiritawards.html
 http://entertainment.timesonline.co.uk/tol/arts_and_entertainment/film/film_reviews/article6818612.ece
 http://planetgreen.discovery.com/tv/reel-impact/watch-big-river-man.html

American film directors
Living people
Artists from New Orleans
Year of birth missing (living people)